Notaeolidiidae is a taxonomic family of sea slugs, specifically aeolid nudibranchs, marine  gastropod molluscs in the superfamily Aeolidioidea.

Genera
Genera and species within the family Notaeolidiidae include:
 Notaeolidia (Eliot, 1905)
 Notaeolidia depressa Eliot, 1907
 Notaeolidia gigas Eliot, 1905
 Notaeolidia schmekelae Wägele, 1990

References